Guiraut Riquier de Narbona ( 1230 in Narbonne – 1292 in Narbonne or Rodez) is among the last of the Occitan troubadours. He is well known because of his great care in writing out his works and keeping them together—the New Grove Encyclopedia considers him an "anthologist" of his own works.

He served under Aimery IV, Viscount of Narbonne, as well as Alfonso el Sabio, King of Castile. He is also believed to have worked under Henry II, Count of Rodez. He composed a partimen with the Jewish troubadour Bonfilh. He invented the genre of the serena (evening song).

Works
Guiraut Riquier: Humils, forfaitz, repres e penedens... in Dietmar Rieger, ed. & transl., Mittelalterliche Lyrik Frankreichs 1. Lieder der Trobadors. Zweisprachig Provençalisch – Deutsch. Reclams Universal-Bibliothek No. 7620, Stuttgart 1980 (Guiraut: p. 288 – 233, commentary from Rieger 314–316, Literature)  In German and Occitan

Notes

13th-century French troubadours
1230s births
1292 deaths
People from Narbonne